The  Philadelphia Eagles season was the franchise's 47th season in the National Football League (NFL).

They appeared in the postseason for the second consecutive year, an attainment that the team had not achieved for three decades. They would make the playoffs again in the following two seasons before a six-year drought. The Eagles managed to host and win their first playoff game since 1960.

Offseason
After going 9–7 in the 1978 season and making the playoffs, the Eagles found themselves having to follow rule 3 of the draft – "Teams that made the playoffs are then ordered by which round of the playoffs they are eliminated" – meaning four teams with a record the same or better than the Eagles would pick in front of them.

NFL Draft
The 1979 NFL Draft was the procedure by which National Football League teams selected amateur college football players. It is officially known as the NFL Annual Player Selection Meeting. The draft was held May 3–4, 1979 in New York City.  As was started with the 1977 NFL Draft, this was 12 rounds.

The Philadelphia Eagles got the 19th to the 21st picks in the 12 rounds. They had overcome the traded-away draft picks of the Mike McCormack era. The Eagles had waited but they finally had a first-round pick and other low-round draft picks. They would use these and build a team as 7 of the 10 draft picks made the team for the coming years.

The draft began with first overall pick of Tom Cousineau, linebacker from Ohio State, by the  Buffalo Bills. With the number 7 pick the New York Giants selected Phil Simms, a quarterback from Morehead State.  The crowd, made up of mostly New York fans, voiced their displeasure of his selection.

Player selections
The table shows the Eagles selections and what picks they had that were traded away and the team that ended up with that pick. It is possible the Eagles' pick ended up with this team via another trade the Eagles made. Not shown are acquired picks that the Eagles traded away.

Roster

Regular season

Schedule

Note: Intra-division opponents are in bold text.

Game summaries

Week 1

Week 2

Week 3

Week 4

Week 5

Week 6

Week 7

Week 8

Week 9

Week 10

Week 11

Week 12

Week 13

Week 14

Week 15

Week 16

Standings

Playoffs

Wild Card

Divisional

Awards and honors

References

 Eagles on Pro Football Reference
 Eagles on jt-sw.com
 Eagles on Eagles.net

Philadelphia Eagles seasons
Philadelphia Eagles
Philadel